Miscellaneous T is a B-side and remix compilation album released by the alternative rock band They Might Be Giants in 1991. It is a US re-release of Don't Let's Start (which was only released in the UK and West Germany), with different cover art, track order, and the additional song "Hello Radio".

The album consists of all of the B-sides from the singles the band released between 1987 and 1989 (except "Ana Ng"), with the addition of the relatively new songs "The World's Address (Joshua Fried Remix)"—released beforehand only on Don't Let's Start—and "Hello Radio", which was previously released on a promotional sampler.

All of the songs, with the exception of "(She Was A) Hotel Detective (Single Mix)", are included on Then: The Earlier Years, a compilation of the band's early material.

Miscellaneous T is said to be named for the section in record stores where They Might Be Giants' albums were most often shelved in the band's early years.

Critical reception
Trouser Press called the compilation a "neat if uneven appendix to the longplaying oeuvre." The Spin Alternative Record Guide wrote that it "reveals TMBG's enormous depth of material."

Song notes
The tracks are grouped according to the singles they originally appeared with:
1–3: "Purple Toupee" (unreleased)
5–7: "They'll Need a Crane"
9–14: "(She Was A) Hotel Detective"
15–18: "Don't Let's Start"

The 13th track, which has no name listed on the album's track listing, is not actually a song, but a snippet of a recording inadvertently left on the TMBG Dial-A-Song answering machine, in which a confused listener named Gloria talks to an unknown third party about the mystery of "There May Be Giants" and "There Must Be Giants", as she mistakenly refers to the band. It would later be referenced when Bryant Gumbel referred to them as "They Must Be Giants" when they performed "Your Racist Friend" on the Today Show to promote the release of Flood.

"Lady Is a Tramp" is a cover of a song from the Rodgers and Hart musical Babes in Arms.

Track listing
All songs by They Might Be Giants unless otherwise noted.
Side one

Side two

References

External links
 Miscellaneous T page at This Might Be A Wiki

B-side compilation albums
They Might Be Giants compilation albums
1991 compilation albums
Restless Records compilation albums